This is a list of the 87 members of the European Parliament for Italy in the 1994 to 1999 session.

List

Notes

Italy
List
1994